Henckovce (1470 Henczko, Hentzendorf, 1551 Henczkowcze, 1563 Henczowetz, 1590 Henczkowa) is a village and municipality in the Rožňava District in the Košice Region of eastern Slovakia.

History
In historical records the village was first mentioned in 1470 when some Germans settled there. The Bebek family ruled the village in the past and here transferred Rusyn colonists known as Walachian.

Geography
The village lies at an altitude of 349 meters and covers an area of 10.032 km².
It has a population of approximately 432 people.

Culture
The village has a small public library.

Genealogical resources

The records for genealogical research are available at the state archive "Statny Archiv in Kosice, Slovakia"

 Lutheran church records (births/marriages/deaths): 1815-1900 (parish B)

See also
 List of municipalities and towns in Slovakia

External links
https://web.archive.org/web/20070513023228/http://www.statistics.sk/mosmis/eng/run.html
https://web.archive.org/web/20050103063436/http://www.retep.sk/henckovce.htm
http://www.henckovce.sk/
Surnames of living people in Henckovce

Villages and municipalities in Rožňava District